Strangers in Paradise is a creator-owned comic book series, written and drawn by Terry Moore, which debuted in 1993. Principally the story of a love triangle between two women and one man, Strangers in Paradise began as a slice-of-life dramedy that later expanded to incorporate aspects of the crime and thriller genres. Moore has remained the sole creator throughout the run, with the exception of a superhero dream sequence drawn by Jim Lee that opens Volume 3, issue #1. The artwork was originally presented in Moore's distinctive black-and-white style, aside from two full colour dream sequences, which included the aforementioned superhero panels.

The majority of the run has been published under Moore's creator-owned imprint, Abstract Studio. The first issue was published January 1, 1993, and the original series reached its planned conclusion in 2007 with issue #90 of Volume 3.

In 2012, Moore announced he was working on a Strangers in Paradise novel at Comic-Con International.

In 2018, Moore officially revived the series as Strangers in Paradise XXV for the 25th anniversary.

Origins and publication history 
Terry Moore stated that "I started out wanting to do a newspaper strip, and tried one idea after another before I realised I hated the gag-a-day life and really wanted to try a story instead". The story he chose to tell turned out to be Strangers in Paradise, or "this story about 2 girls and a guy who gets to know them" (from Moore's introduction to The Collected Strangers in Paradise, Volume One), which used characters he had developed during his time on the gag-a-day circuit. For example, Katchoo appears as a "happy-go-lucky wood nymph" in an early strip by Moore about an enchanted forest. These strips were collected into two trade paperbacks, but they did not include three issues. Because of this, the entire run was later published in one large paperback edition entitled The Complete Paradise Too. This volume can be considered the true origin of Katchoo, Francine and the Strangers in Paradise universe.

SiP, as it is commonly known, began as a three-issue mini-series published by Antarctic Press in 1993, which focused entirely on the relationship between the three main characters and Francine's unfaithful boyfriend. This is now known as "Volume 1". Thirteen issues were published under Moore's own "Abstract Studio" imprint, and these make up "Volume 2". This is where the "thriller" plot was introduced. The series moved to Image Comics' Homage imprint for the start of "Volume 3", but after eight issues moved back to Abstract Studio, where it continued with the same numbering. Volume 3 concluded at issue #90, released on June 6, 2007.

Moore revived the series as Strangers in Paradise XXV in 2018 for the 25th anniversary. The new miniseries included characters and elements from Moore's other works, Echo, Rachel Rising, and Motor Girl.

Plot
The story primarily concerns the difficult relationship between two women, Helen Francine Peters (referred to as Francine throughout the series) and Katina Marie ("Katchoo") Choovanski, and their friend David Qin. Francine considers Katchoo her best friend; Katchoo is in love with Francine. David is in love with Katchoo (a relationship which Katchoo herself is deeply conflicted over).

The love triangle (which later expands into a love rectangle with the introduction of Casey Bullock, who marries Francine's ex-boyfriend Freddie Femur and later divorces him, in order to pursue both David and Katchoo) alternates with the mystery and intrigue regarding Katchoo's past as an underage lesbian call girl and the Parker Crime Syndicate. Run by David's lesbian sister Darcy, the "Parker Girls" work for the shadowy 'Big Six' organization, an international crime syndicate with influence over the world of politics. "Parker Girls" are highly trained women used by organized crime to control, manipulate, spy upon, and ultimately kill men and women in positions of power and authority, for the Big Six.

Characters
Katina "Katchoo" Choovanski Katchoo (occasionally referred to as "The Original Angry Blonde" by fans of the series) is a temperamental artist with a violent past. A former prostitute, Katchoo was the lover and agent of Darcy Parker. Katchoo has been in love with her best friend, Francine, for most of her life, though she has complicated romantic feelings for her only male friend, David, as well. Katchoo was ranked 69th in Comics Buyer's Guide's "100 Sexiest Women in Comics" list.
Francine Helena Peters-Silver Katchoo's kind-hearted best friend. Francine struggles with her weight and her self-image, never quite able to see the beauty in herself that Katchoo is enamored with. Francine has difficulty bringing herself to make a romantic commitment to Katchoo, partly due to her Methodist upbringing and partly because of her childhood dream to become a wife and mother. Her fairytale marriage to Brad Silver comes crashing down when she realizes that he is unfaithful to her, leading her to reconsider choosing him over Katchoo. Francine was ranked 86th in Comics Buyer's Guide's "100 Sexiest Women in Comics" list.
Yousaka Takahashi/David Qin A gentle, sensitive art student, Yousaka is the younger brother of Darcy Parker and the unwilling heir to the Takahashi crime syndicate. Once the leader of a violent street gang, Yousaka became a born-again Christian after a personal tragedy and he changed his name to "David Qin" to reflect his new identity and honoring the young man he murdered. The complex romantic feelings he harbors for Casey and Katchoo come to a head when he is diagnosed with a serious illness, leading the trio to contemplate having a baby in his memory.
Casey Bullock-Femur A blonde, busty, and bisexual aerobics instructor, Casey was married to Freddie Femur but divorced him after learning that he was still in love with Francine. Since the divorce, she has had romantic involvements with both Katchoo and David. Because of her childhood anorexia, she is unable to have a child with David.
Freddie Femur Francine's ex-boyfriend and Casey's ex-husband. A womanizing attorney, Freddie cheated on Francine and humiliated her during their break-up (giving her a nervous breakdown in the process) but later becomes obsessed with her.
Darcy Parker Darcy was a ruthless and predatory crime boss who led the "Parker Girls", women who are skilled in various acts of seduction and espionage. Though she employed only women and expresses a profound abhorrence of the male gender itself, Darcy had an intense, incestuous love for her brother David. She had a relationship with Katchoo until Katchoo ran away to Hawaii with her friend Emma. Darcy was murdered by Tambi after the collapse of her crime syndicate.
Mary Beth "Tambi" BakerA brutal enforcer who worked for Darcy Parker alongside her twin sister Sara Beth "Bambi", Tambi is skilled in not only the deadly arts, but in business and strategy. She and Sara are Katchoo's older half-sisters. In a quest to continue the Baker line, she subconsciously encourages Katchoo to bear David's child. Tambi's many scars are self-inflicted.
Griffin Silver An aging rock star admired by Katchoo in her youth, Griffin's songs were printed in the series long before the character made his first appearance. He was the brother of Brad Silver. Griffin was shot and killed by a stalker.
Brad Silver A charming, handsome gynecologist, Brad at first appears to be an ideal husband for Francine; however, their inability to communicate drives a wedge between them. When Francine discovers his infidelity, she initiates divorce proceedings.
Molly LaneMolly has only a tenuous connection to the main SiP cast (she dated Francine's brother Benjamin in high school) but has nevertheless been the star of one of the book's major storylines. The protagonist of "Molly and Poo", Molly is a tortured writer who dreams of a mysterious muse ("Ma Malai") and murders her husband with a meat cleaver.

Awards
The series received the Eisner Award for Best Serialized Story in 1996 for "I Dream of You" as well as the National Cartoonists Society Reuben Award for Best Comic Book in 2003. It also won the GLAAD Award for Best Comic Book in 2001.

Collected editions

Strangers in Paradise has been collected into a series of full-size trade paperbacks, hardback collections, and smaller format paperback collections. These reprints collect the issues into different sets.

The full-size paperback collections to date are:

The hardback collections to date are:

The "pocket book" collections to date are:

Other books to date are:
 Lyrics and Poems
 Strangers in Paradise Source Book
 Strangers in Paradise Treasury Edition
 Strangers in Paradise calendars: 1999, 2000, 2002, 2003, 2004. For unknown reasons, there is no 2001 calendar.

Merchandise
Two limited edition statuettes of Katchoo were produced by Clayburn Moore as the first in a planned series of three statues based around the series. In the first, she is standing in a skimpy black dress, and in the second she is reclining in a bath wearing her leather jacket and holding a drink and a gun.

In 2009, Shocker Toys released a Katchoo figure as part of the first series of its "Indie Spotlight" line.

In 1996, a series of trading cards was released by Comic Images, consisting of a 90-card base set plus extra collector's cards, such as the 500 'autograph cards' that featured Terry Moore's signature and information on the creation of SiP. These extra cards were inserted randomly into packs. Also produced was a matching SiP binder, which came with 12 9-pocket sleeves to hold the cards.

Advertised on the official SiP website are character pin badges representing Francine, Katchoo and David. There is also a black tote bag featuring the Strangers in Paradise logo and a tumbler decorated with colour panels from the series, in addition to a postcard set and two T-shirts, although several of these items are listed as 'sold out', and are hard to come by elsewhere.

Film adaptation
Angela Robinson and Moore announced in Autumn 2017 that they were developing the film adaptation. Moore was working on a script for it. IMG Global Media is backing the project and Robinson will direct.

References

External links 
Strangers in Paradise website

1990s LGBT literature
1993 comics debuts
2007 comics endings
Antarctic Press titles
Comics publications
Defunct American comics
Eisner Award winners
Female bisexuality in fiction
GLAAD Media Award for Outstanding Comic Book winners
Lesbian-related comics
WildStorm titles